Matthew David Cullen (born November 2, 1976) is an American former professional ice hockey center who played 21 seasons in the National Hockey League (NHL) with eight teams between 1997 and 2019 with. Cullen won the Stanley Cup three times during his career, with the Carolina Hurricanes in 2006 and the Pittsburgh Penguins in 2016 and 2017, and won a bronze medal in at the 2004 World Championships with the United States.

As of 2022, Cullen is one of 21 players to play over 1,500 NHL games, and the only one of the group to never be named an All-Star.

Playing career
Cullen graduated from Moorhead High School in 1995; his father, Terry Cullen, was the school's varsity ice hockey coach. During his time at Moorhead High, Cullen led Moorhead to three state tourney appearances and two runner-up finishes. He was an all-state tourney selection three years, and was a Mr. Hockey finalist in 1995, when he was named the state's Player of the Year by the Associated Press after scoring 47 goals and adding 42 assists in 28 games.

Cullen played at St. Cloud State University from 1995 to 1997, and was named to the WCHA All-Rookie Team in 1995 and WCHA All-Star in 1996. He was then drafted in the second round, 35th overall, by the Mighty Ducks of Anaheim in the 1996 NHL Entry Draft. Cullen played for the Ducks from 1997 until 2003 when he was traded to the Florida Panthers. He also played on four World Championship teams and was a 2004 bronze medalist on Team USA.

During the 2004–05 NHL lockout, Cullen played in the Italian Serie A with SG Cortina, where he led the league in scoring with 27 goals and 33 assists in 36 games.

In the 2005–06 season, after NHL play resumed, Cullen won the Stanley Cup with the Carolina Hurricanes. After the season, he became an unrestricted free agent and subsequently signed a four-year contract with the New York Rangers. After just one season with the Rangers, Cullen was traded back to the Hurricanes during the 2006–07 off-season in exchange for defenseman Andrew Hutchinson, forward Joe Barnes and a third-round draft pick in the 2008 NHL Entry Draft in the Rangers' attempt to free up salary space underneath the cap.

On February 22, 2009, Cullen scored the first hat-trick of his career in a game against the Colorado Avalanche. On February 12, 2010, he was traded to the Ottawa Senators in exchange for Alexandre Picard and a second-round draft pick.

On July 1, 2010, Cullen returned to his home state when he signed a three-year deal as a free agent with the Minnesota Wild. Upon the expiration of his three-year contract with the Wild, and with the team facing salary cap constraints, Cullen departed as a free agent and signed a two-year contract with the Nashville Predators on July 5, 2013.

On August 6, 2015, Cullen signed a one-year deal with the Pittsburgh Penguins, reuniting him with former Hurricanes' general manager Jim Rutherford, with whom he won a Stanley Cup in 2006. Cullen won his second Stanley Cup on June 12, 2016. On August 17, 2016, Cullen signed a second one-year deal with the Penguins. On June 11, 2017, Cullen won his second consecutive Stanley Cup with the Penguins when they defeated the Predators in six games in the Stanley Cup Finals.

On August 16, 2017, after winning back-to-back Stanley Cup championships with the Penguins, Cullen signed a one-year contract to return to the Minnesota Wild. After Jaromír Jágr was placed on waivers by the Calgary Flames that season, Cullen became the oldest active player in the NHL at 41.

On July 1, 2018, Cullen returned to the Penguins, signing a one-year contract, after spending the previous season with the Wild.

On July 10, 2019, after completing 21 seasons in the NHL, Cullen announced his retirement from professional hockey.

After retiring from the NHL in 2019, Cullen became a player development coach for the Pittsburgh Penguins. He saw his first action as a NHL bench coach in mid-2022 for the Penguins when filling in for an injured coach.

Personal life
Cullen is the older brother of EC Red Bull Salzburg player Mark Cullen, as well as of Braehead Clan player Joe Cullen. Matt Cullen has a wife and three sons. Cullen currently resides in Moorhead, Minnesota, in the off-season with his family. Cullen is a Christian.

Cullen founded the "Cullen Children's Foundation", also known as "Cully's Kids", in 2003. The foundation provides financial resources to organizations that support children's healthcare needs with an emphasis on cancer.

In 2020, Matt Cullen bought in on the Fargo Force Hockey Academy and changed the name to the Cullen Force Academy upon his buy in. https://www.fargoforce.com/news_article/show/1155753

Career statistics

Regular season and playoffs

International

Awards and honors

See also
List of NHL players with 1,000 games played

References

External links
 
Matt Cullen's Day With the Stanley Cup

1976 births
American men's ice hockey centers
Anaheim Ducks draft picks
Baltimore Bandits players
Carolina Hurricanes players
Cincinnati Mighty Ducks players
Florida Panthers players
Ice hockey players from Minnesota
Living people
Mighty Ducks of Anaheim players
Minnesota Wild players
Nashville Predators players
New York Rangers players
Ottawa Senators players
People from Virginia, Minnesota
Pittsburgh Penguins players
SG Cortina players
St. Cloud State Huskies men's ice hockey players
Stanley Cup champions